Saruga may refer to:

Saruga language
Saruga Shrine
Saruga (fly), a genus in subfamily Pachygastrinae